The Civil Society for Reform,, is an Iraqi political party recently established by the Speaker of the Iraqi Council of Representatives Salim al-Jabouri.

History
This political party was founded on August 15, 2017 by the Speaker of the Iraqi Council of Representatives Salim al-Jabouri. al-Abadi intends to enter into the Iraqi elections with Iyad Allawi in the "National Coalition", which will be held in May 2018.

References

External links 
 Speech of the Secretary General of the Civil Rally for Reform Salim al-Jabouri during the founding conference of the party

2017 establishments in Iraq
Formerly banned political parties
Iran–Iraq relations
Islamic political parties in Iraq
Political parties established in 2017
Political parties in Iraq
Sunni Islamic political parties